Maxime Old (1910–1991) was a French interior architect and furniture designer. He is known for his numerous works of art, and as forerunner of the transition from the style of the 30s to modern design. Yves Badetz, chief curator at the Orsay Museum, in charge of decorative arts, confesses that “The emotions you feel when looking at Maxime Old’s creations are intense. His thoughtful esthetics freely associates the values of the rational of Bauhaus with Ruhlmann's demand for perfection. His talent is to design the refined outlines anticipating the third millennium."

Biography

Family History 
Maxime Old has been born in Maisons-Alfort (Val-de-Marne) in 1910. He is coming from a long line of master cabinetmakers. His father, Louis Old is the son of Jean Léonard (Johann Leonhard) Old, Germany originated, master cabinetmaker. Louis marries Maximillienne, daughter of Joseph (Giuseppe) Carosi, master cabinetmaker, originated from Italy. Working as a team, they decide to fuse the two workshops together to make 37 Rue Chanzy Paris, a workshop that Louis Old will then manage himself. With the help of his spouse and approximately 15 employees at the time, Louis Old realises furniture in order to be sold to furniture stores, as well as individuals.

Education 
After studying four years at l’Ecole Boulle, Maxime Old graduates top of the year and transfers directly to Jacques-Emile Ruhlmann design team, where he collaborates until the end in 1934. These two great experiences gave him a different perspective, installed a certain demanding nature in him, new techniques, and knowledge, that will then help him transform the family business into a world-renowned decorative art name.

Initial works and recognition 
In 1934, when J.E. Rulhman dies, his company is close as he ordered it. His customers in contact with Maxime ask him to continue to work for them. Maxime goes back to its family cabinetmaker workshop and turn it round to satisfy this demanding private customer base. Maxime Old quickly develops an elegant, modern style that fits with the demanding requests of his clientele: Industries, politicians, lawyers, doctor etc.... He designs and produces art furniture embedded in interior architecture innovative master plans.

He is particularly known for his elegant transformative pieces of furniture. He has been said the "sofabed inventor"!

In 1939 Maxime Old exhibits his works at the International Exhibition New-York World's Fair.

Until the 1960s, he participates in all of the « Artistes Decorateurs » and "Salons des Arts Ménagers" exhibitions, where many of his art pieces are awarded. This success brings the grand opening of his gallery on Avenue Hoche in Paris in order to exhibit his art, and help young prodigies be recognized by the art world.

Several schools such as the "Ecole Nationale Supérieure des Arts Decoratifs" requested his teaching in art furniture design, he headed the decorative architecture PHD of the school.

Institutional works 
More and more, simultaneously to his production for private customers, Maxime Old develops his interior architect activity focused on institutional large customers: prestigious ocean liners such as the "SS France (1961)", embassies, famous hotels, large company headquarters, business banks, airports, city halls even presidential palaces, both in France and in other countries.

For these large projects he provides both the overall interior master plan and the all individual pieces of furniture of his own design. He experiences innovative techniques and new materials beside traditional ones to achieve creative functional designs. The professional press points out the consistency of these major work of art.

Modern his style is, modern his thinking is! Beside his prestigious unique pieces Maxime studies models for optimized editions. He teaches it, but never practices it on a large scall basis out of his own control. He was too much a perfectionist to give up.

In 19?? Maxime is awarded Chevalier of the French Academy of Arts and Letters. equivalent to the American Academy of Arts and Letters.

In 1954, he is awarded Chevalier of the Legion of Honour.

In 1958 he is head of the French hotel trade pavilion interior design for the Universal Exhibition "Brussels World's Fair". His work is awarded "Grand Prix".

Significant works

Shows & Events 
International Exhibition 1939 : New-York World's Fair

International Exhibition 1958 : Brussels World's Fair

From the 30s to the 60s, Old was present in almost every single « Salon des Artistes Decorateurs, » the most famous art furniture exhibit in France at this time.

From the 50s to the 60s, Salon des Arts Ménagers, modern & functional housing exhibition in Paris

Ocean liners 
SS Atlantique, SS La Marseillaise, SS Île-de-France, SS Liberté, SS Antilles, SS Flandre, SS Ville de Marseille, SS Ville de Tunis, SS France (1961), SS Ancerville

Embassies and Palaces 
Foreign Office France, French embassies in : Oslo (Norway), La Haye (Netherlands), Ottawa (Canada), Ghana, Helsinki (Finland)

President H. Bourguiba Palace (Tunisia), Mohammed V of Morocco Palace (Morocco)

Banks & Companies headquarters 
Société des Forges Le Creusot, Framatome, Régie Autonome des Pétroles, Compagnie Française du Raffinage, Caisse Centrale du Crédit Immobilier et Commercial, banque de l'Union Européenne Industrielle et Financière

Hotels 
Marhaba Hotel in Casablanca (Morocco), El Aurassi à Alger (Ageria), Le Fort Royal à Deshaies (Guadeloupe), Frantel Paris-Orly

Other major projects 
Marseille air-port (1961), Paris-Orsay Science University, Rouen City-Hall

Bibliography 
Yves Badetz, Maxime Old Architecte-Décorateur, Editions Norma, 2000, read on line

Elisabeth Védrenne, Les 50 glorieuses de Maxime Old, Le journal des Arts.fr - l'Oeil, 2000, preview on line

Lorraine Tissier-Rebour, Art history master thesis : Maxime Old : Une inventivité et un savoir-faire à la rencontre de la modernité, Paris-Sorbonne University, 2014, read on line

Armelle Bouchet-Mazas, Le Paquebot France, Editions Norma 2006, preview on line

René Chavance, Bibliothèque Nationale de France, Art et décoration 1937, preview on line

Pierre Kjellberg, Le mobilier du XX siècle, Dictionnaire des créateurs, Editions de l'Amateur, 1994, preview on line

Notes and references

External links 
 Bibliography summary
 Maxime Old reference site
 Docantic Maxime Old Biographie
 The Red List; Old Maxime page

1910 births
1991 deaths
French architects
French artists
French furniture designers
People from Maisons-Alfort